Eudesmic acid is an O-methylated trihydroxybenzoic acid.

Natural Occurrence
It can be found in Eucalyptus spp.

Synthesis
Eudesmic acid is most directly synthesized by reaction of gallic acid with dimethyl sulfate.

Derivatives
Esterified with Deanol.
Trimebutine
Amoproxan
Bernzamide
3,4,5-trimethoxy-N-(pyridin-4-yl)benzamide [31638-97-8].
Butobendine
Capobenic acid
Dilazep
Ecipramidil
Fepromide
Hexobendine
Mepramidil (Diphenamilate)
TMB-8 [57818-92-5]
Tricetamide (Trimeglamide)
Trimethobenzamide
Trimetozine
Tritiozine (ala trimetozine but thioamide).
Trocimine [14368-24-2]
Troxipide (Lefron)
Troxonium
Troxypyrrolium (Troxypyrrole, Trox)
Trimetamide.
Vinmegallate (RGH-4417)
Leonuramine and Leonurine.
Methoserpidine, Reserpine and Deserpidine.

References 

Benzoic acids
O-methylated natural phenols
Eucalyptus